Prey are organisms attacked and eaten by other organisms.

Prey may also refer to:

Places
 Prey, Eure, a commune in Eure, France
 Prey, Vosges, a commune in Vosges, France
 Prey Veng Province, Cambodia
 Prey Veng (city), capital of the province

People
 Edmond Lefebvre du Prey (1866–1955), French politician (family name is Lefebvre du Prey)
 Hermann Prey (1929–1998), German lyric baritone

Arts, entertainment, and media

Film
 The Prey (1920 film), American drama film directed by George L. Sargent
 The Prey (1921 film), a French-Italian silent film
 The Prey (1974 film), an Italian erotic film
 Prey (1977 film), a low-budget British science-fiction horror film, directed by Norman J. Warren
 The Prey (1983 film), an American horror film, written and directed by Edwin Brown
 The Prey, a 2000 science fiction film starring Kari Wuhrer
 Prey (2007 film), a South African horror film
 Prey (2009 film), a low-budget Australian supernatural horror film
 The Prey (2011 film), a French film with the French title La Proie
 The Prey, a 2016 American film, directed by Cire Hensman; see Danny Trejo filmography
 The Prey (2018 film), a US-Cambodian film
 Prey (2019 Canadian film), a Canadian documentary film
 Prey (2019 American film), an American horror film directed by Franck Khalfoun
 Prey (2021 film), a German film
 Prey (2022 film), an American film in the Predator franchise.

Literature
 Prey (novel), by Michael Crichton
 "Prey", a short story by Richard Matheson, basis for the "Devil Doll" segment of the film Trilogy of Terror
 Prey: Immigration, Islam, and the erosion of women's rights, a 2021 non-fiction book by Ayaan Hirsi Ali
 Batman: Prey, a Batman comics story arc

Music

Albums
 Prey (Tiamat album), 2003
 Prey (Planes Mistaken for Stars album), 2016

Songs
 "The Prey" (song), a 1981 B-side by the Dead Kennedys
 "Prey", a song by Brutal Truth from the 1997 album Sounds of the Animal Kingdom
 "Prey", a song by 10 Years from the 2005 album The Autumn Effect
 "Prey", a song by Recoil from the 2007 album subHuman

Television

Series
 Prey (American TV  series), a 1998 science-fiction TV series starring Debra Messing
 Prey (British TV series), an ITV 2014–2015 detective-drama TV series starring Rosie Cavaliero

Episodes
 "Prey" (Star Trek: Voyager), an episode of season four of Star Trek: Voyager
 "Prey" (The Walking Dead), an episode of the television series The Walking Dead
"Prey", season 3, episode 5 of the TV series Animal Kingdom

Video games
 Prey (2006 video game), a first-person shooter developed by Human Head Studios
 Prey (2017 video game), a first-person shooter developed by Arkane Studios

Other uses
 Prey (software), a service for tracking stolen electronic devices

See also
 Pray (disambiguation)